The Huldreskorvene Peaks are a group of summit peaks and crags just north of Skorvehalsen Saddle and west of Tussenobba Peak in the Mühlig-Hofmann Mountains of Queen Maud Land, Antarctica. They were mapped by Norwegian cartographers from surveys and air photos by the Sixth Norwegian Antarctic Expedition (1956–61), and named by the Norwegians.

References

Mountains of Queen Maud Land
Princess Astrid Coast